Paracedemon is a genus of longhorn beetles of the subfamily Lamiinae, containing the following species:

 Paracedemon niger Breuning, 1957
 Paracedemon ruber Breuning, 1942

References

Tragocephalini
Cerambycidae genera